Xestia speciosa is a moth of the family Noctuidae. It is found in northern Europe, including Fennoscandia, the Baltic region, parts of Russia and further through northern Asia to the Pacific Ocean and Japan. It is also found in the mountainous areas of central and southern Europe. It is also present in north-western North America.

Some authors treat Xestia apropitia as a valid species, while Mikkola, Lafontaine and Kononenko (1996) placed it as a subspecies of Xestia speciosa.

The wingspan of ssp. speciosa is 38–50 mm. Subspecies arctica has a wingspan of 36–45 mm. Adults are on wing from June to August in one generation.

The larvae feed on various low-growing plants, including Vaccinium myrtillus,
Lonicera nigra and Betula nana.

Subspecies
Note that only speciosa, arctica and modesta are confirmed subspecies. The other listed subspecies need further study to confirm their status. Xestia viridescens is sometimes included here as another subspecies.

Generally accepted
Xestia speciosa speciosa (Hübner, 1813) (Germany)
Xestia speciosa modesta (Alps)
Xestia speciosa arctica (Zetterstedt 1839) (northern Europe, northern Canada south to the northern parts of the mountains in Alberta)
Disputed
Xestia speciosa aegrota (Alpheraky 1897) (Siberia, northern Mongolia)
Xestia speciosa aklavikensis (Nearctic)
Xestia speciosa apropitia (Benjamin, 1933) (Colorado)
Xestia speciosa baltica (Valle 1940)
Xestia speciosa janae Herz, 1903
Xestia speciosa livalis (Nearctic)
Xestia speciosa mixta
Xestia speciosa rybatchiensis Kotzsch 1934
Xestia speciosa ussurica (north-eastern Siberia to Korea and Japan)

External links
Lepiforum e. V.
Schmetterlinge-Deutschlands.de

Xestia
Moths of Asia
Moths of Europe
Moths of North America